Rüdiger Sünner, born 1953 in Köln on the Rhine, is a German author and documentary film maker, most notable for his book and his documentary on the Schwarze Sonne.

Biography
1970 Abitur

From 1972 to 1985 he studied music, music science, German and philosophy. Beside being a musician in different Pop groups and training activity as flutist.

In 1985 he graduated in the art and philosophy of Theodor Ludwig Wiesengrund Adorno and Friedrich Wilhelm Nietzsche.

From 1986-1991 he studied at the German film and television academy in Berlin (DFFB).

Since 1991 he has operated as author, film producer and musician in Berlin.

Schwarze Sonne
Schwarze Sonne (Black Sun) is a 2001 German book by Sünner that explores the occult roots of Nazism .

Sünner also produced a documentary of the same name. While filming at the Wewelsburg castle, he was allegedly threatened by a skinhead, brandishing his fist with a Black Sun tattoo. Apparently he regarded Sünner's film as a desecration.

See also
Schwarze Sonne

References

External links
Personal website
 

1953 births
Living people

Film people from Cologne
German male writers